Liepert is a German language surname. It is similar to the surname Lippert.

List of people with the surname 

 Beate G. Liepert, Canadian scientist
 Ron Liepert (born 1949), Canadian politician from Alberta

See also 

Lippert
Limpertsberg
 Liebertwolkwitz
 Liedertswil
 Liebert (company)

Surnames
Surnames of German origin
German-language surnames
Surnames from given names